Janardhanan Ramdas (born 2 June 1970), is an Indian cricketer. He is a right-handed batsman and a right-arm offbreak bowler. Janardhanan Ramdas was considered as an all-rounder and was selected as the Captain of the U-19 team that toured Pakistan in 1988/89 season. During the 4 test series, he led India U-19 team to its first victory ever as well as achieved it in foreign soil.

Janardhanan Ramdas soon quit the game after just 3 first class matches and 1 List A match.

External links
 

Indian cricketers
Tamil Nadu cricketers
1970 births
Living people
Sportspeople from Madurai
Cricketers from Tamil Nadu